Curtice Hitchcock (March 4, 1892 in Pittsford, Vermont – May 3, 1946), was an American publisher and in 1933 founded Reynal and Hitchcock of New York, New York.

References

1892 births
1946 deaths
American publishers (people)